John Francis Holligan (1 November 1875 – 13 September 1939) was an Australian rules footballer who played with Essendon in the Victorian Football League (VFL).

Family
The son of Michael Holligan, and Mary Holligan (1852-1906), née M‘Garity, John Francis Holligan was born in Geelong on 1 November 1875.

Notes

External links 

1875 births
1939 deaths
Australian rules footballers from Geelong
Essendon Football Club players